Frederick Dana Marsh (1872 – December 20, 1961) was an American illustrator.

Born in 1872 to a prosperous Chicago stockyard merchant, Marsh attended the School of the Art Institute of Chicago, where he worked with artists preparing murals for the Chicago World's Fair in 1893, learning the big brush techniques of mural painting.

He went to Paris where in 1895 he married Alice Randall, a fellow Chicago art student. While living in a studio in Montparnasse they had two sons, James and Reginald, both of whom achieved renown as artists. His "Lady in Scarlet", a full-length portrait of his wife, won the International Bronze Medal and was exhibited extensively. It now resides in the Newark Museum in New Jersey.

Marsh and his family returned to New York at the turn of the century, moving to Nutley, New Jersey, where they acquired a home located on The Enclosure, a street that had been established as an artists' colony some decades earlier by the American painter Frank Fowler. In 1914 they moved to the well-known New Rochelle artist colony in New Rochelle, New York. Marsh attended Yale University from 1916 through 1920 during which time he worked as Editor of the 'Yale Record'.

He created paintings for wealthy clients, as well as a series of murals entitled "Allegories of Industry" for the New York Engineering Society Library. Marsh also produced a number of terra cotta murals entitled "Maritime History of the Hudson" for the Hotel McAlpin in New York, which were later relocated to the New York City subway in 2000. During World War I, he produced patriotic posters for the publicity department of the Navy.

Marsh largely retired from commercial art in 1928. During the following year his parents, wife and youngest son all died. In 1930 he married the artist, Mabel Van Alstyne, and in 1931 moved to Ormond Beach, Florida where he built a large Streamline Moderne beachside home known as the "Battleship House" (since demolished) which was extensively decorated with murals and relief sculptures. With assistance from his wife, Marsh continued to create artworks while in Florida, including the statue of "Chief Tomokie" at Tomoka State Park and four sculptures of muses for the exterior of the Peabody Auditorium in Daytona Beach. For the rest of his life, Marsh would also continue to split his time between Ormond Beach and Woodstock, New York.

Marsh died on December 20, 1961.

References

External links
Marine Grill Murals at Broadway/Nassau subway stop
"1918 - House and Garden" Residence of Frederick Dana Marsh, Esq, New Rochelle, NY

 

1872 births
1961 deaths
American illustrators
School of the Art Institute of Chicago alumni
Artists from Chicago
Artists from New Rochelle, New York
People from Nutley, New Jersey
People from Woodstock, New York
People from Ormond Beach, Florida
American expatriates in France